George Whitehead may refer to:

 George Whitehead (Quaker leader) (1636–1723), Quaker preacher, author and lobbyist
 George Whitehead (cricketer) (1895–1918), English cricketer
 George Whitehead (rugby union) (born 1989), South African rugby union player
 George W. Whitehead (1918–2004), American mathematician

See also
 George Whitefield (1714–1770), religious figure
 Robert G. Whitehead (Robert George Whitehead, 1916–2007), American businessman